Burnley is a surname. Notable people with the surname include:

 Benjamin Burnley (born 1978), vocalist of American alternative metal band Breaking Benjamin
 Dorothy R. Burnley (1927–2016), American politician and businesswoman from North Carolina
 James H. Burnley IV (born 1948), American politician and lawyer from North Carolina
 Kenneth S. Burnley (1942–2011), senior resident fellow at the University of Michigan School of Education
 Liz Burnley (born 1959), chief guide of Girlguiding UK since 2006
 Roger Burnley (born 1966), British businessman, CEO of Asda

Fictional characters:
 Ilse Burnley, character in Lucy Maud Montgomery's Emily of New Moon series

English toponymic surnames